The Sprague–Marshall–Bowie House, also known as the G.T. Gray House, is a historic Italianate style house in Portland, Oregon that was built in 1882.  It was listed on the National Register of Historic Places in 1980.

References

Houses on the National Register of Historic Places in Portland, Oregon
Italianate architecture in Oregon
Houses completed in 1882
1882 establishments in Oregon
Northwest Portland, Oregon
Historic district contributing properties in Oregon